The Hyunmoo-3 is a cruise missile fielded by the South Korean military designed by Agency for Defense Development (ADD).  The name Hyunmoo comes from a mythical beast described as the "Guardian of the Northern Sky", perhaps hinting North Korea.

Design and development
As a signatory of the multilateral Missile Technology Control Regime, South Korea agrees to refrain from importing a non-indigenous ballistic missile with a warhead larger than 500 kg, or a range of more than 300 km. (In September 2017, the presidents of the ROK and the US agreed "in principle" to lift these bilateral limits, increasing the possibility of a longer-range, more powerful Hyunmoo-4 in the future.)

Therefore, a heavy emphasis was put on developing long-range cruise missiles by the South Korean government. With the introduction of Hyunmoo-3, which also has some advanced systems sometimes found on ICBMs, the Republic of Korea Army created the Missile Command in order to efficiently manage these missiles.

Hyunmoo-3 bears no resemblance to the previous Hyunmoo SSM, which were improved versions of Nike Hercules surface-to-air missiles that were converted into short-range high-speed surface-to-surface ballistic missiles in response to North Korea's Scud-B and Nodong-1 missile threats. Instead, the new missile's designs are strikingly similar to the United States Tomahawk cruise missile. The guidance systems consist of inertial guidance system and global positioning system.

s and KSS-III-class submarines will be equipped with these Chonryong submarine-launched cruise missiles inside their vertical launching system (K-VLS).

A Hyunmoo-3B air-launched cruise missile with over  range exists and it is called Boramae.

A cruise missile called the Haeseong III is designed to be launched underwater from submarines. It is actually the designation for the Hyunmoo-3 cruise missile when launched from a submarine and is unrelated to the SSM-700K Haeseong missile design.

Operators

  (KDX-II)
  (KDX-III)
 Son Won-il-class submarine (KSS-II)

References

Naval cruise missiles
Cruise missiles of South Korea
Post–Cold War weapons of South Korea
Military equipment introduced in the 2000s